Enel Generación Perú S.A.A., formerly Edegel, is the largest private electric power generation company in Peru. The company has a total installed capacity of more than 1.400 megawatts (MW) and it supplies to the Peruvian National Grid.

The company is owned by Enel.

References 

Electric power companies of Peru